Scouting in Western Australia is predominantly represented by a branch of Scouts Australia and Girl Guides Western Australia, a member organisation of Girl Guides Australia.

Scouting began in Western Australia in 1908 when eighteen-year-old Frank Roche from Spearwood established the first Scout Patrol. By the end of 1909 there were 416 members in 16 groups. In 1912, the Founder, Robert Baden-Powell visited Perth.

Girl Guides started in Western Australia in 1915 in a very formal way when the Women's Service Guild staged a public meeting, under Vice Regal patronage, in the Perth Town Hall on 28 June 1915. The Governor moved, "That a Girl Guide Association be formed in this State and that we apply to the Girl Guide Association of Great Britain for a warrant". 



Scouts Australia

The Branch is organised around districts:

Perth Metropolitan Districts
 Wanneroo
 Joondalup
 Swan Valley
 Central Swan
 Sunset Coast
 Stirling East
 Bilgoman
 Kalamunda
 Woodloes River
 Peel
 Minderup
 River Ranges
 Melville
 Beeliar
 Minnawarra
 Beeloo

Regional Districts
 Kimberley
 Pilbara
 Avon
 Moresby Ranges
 Goldfields
 Stirling
 Forrest and Vasse
 Central Great Southern

Activities 

A Scout Gang Show started in Perth in 1962 (and currently in recess). Two Australian Scout Jamborees have been held in Western Australia in 1979/80 and 1994/95.

Sea Scouts in Western Australia are active. The premier Sea Scout Competition in WA is the Master Mariners competition. The Junior Shield is currently held by Canning Sea Scouts, the Senior Shield by Canning Venturer Sea Scouts and the Rover Oar by Pelican Point Rover Crew. There are currently 10 sea scout groups in WA.

There is a Scout Water Activity Centre located in Como that land-based groups can use. An annual regatta is held there.

Air Scouts is currently represented by the Bullsbrook Air Scout Group.

Facilities

Scouts WA Adventure Centres 

Scouts WA Adventure Centre Eaton. On the banks of the Collie River at Eaton in the Shire of Dardanup, just 8 km from Bunbury.
Scouts WA Adventure Centre Gilcreek. On the bank of the King River, 12 km from Albany. 
Scouts WA Adventure Centre Manjedal. Near Byford about one hours drive from Perth is the Branch's major Camp Site and Training Centre, established in 1967.
Scouts WA Adventure Centre Vasse 280 km south west of Perth near Busselton.

Other facilities

 Northam Scout Camp. 97 km east of Perth and 4.5 km west of Northam. The campsite's southern boundary is the north side of the Kep Track, which follows the Goldfields Pipeline in the area and is used for hiking, walking, cycling, and horse riding.
 Toowacka Campsite. Bay of Isles, Esperance.
 Scout Water Activity Centre, in Como, near Canning Bridge in Perth.

Major branch events

 OneCamp 2023, a new event for April 2023, for all sections for one major camp, for the Swan Valley Adventure Centre.  
Branch Venturer Council held every second month.
 Nighthawk: A night-time orienteering event for Scouts.
 Rottnest Invasion: Held at Rottnest Island where Scouts and Venturers do community service. 
 Youth awards: New Australian Scout Award, Queen's Scout and Baden-Powell Award recipients every February are presented their certificate by the State Governor. 
 Campwest: Held every three years, Campwest is a small scale jamboree, held between Australian jamborees.

The following are the major competitions that are held in Western Australia.

Scouts
 Cargeeg Challenge Shield (Scouts) – the Premier Camping competition in Western Australia for Scouts at Manjedal Scout Centre, is currently held by Donny Brook Scouts Troop.
 Master Mariners Junior Shield (Scouts) – the Premier Boating competition in Western Australia for Scouts, is currently held by Canning Sea Scouts.
 Swan Tiki – a Bi-annual Rafting event for Scout section, the overall trophy is currently held by Bibra Lake Scouts.
 Orienteering – held annually at a national park in Perth. There are many categories in which teams compete to collect the most points.

Venturer Scouts
 Master Mariners Senior Shield – premier boating competition in Western Australia for Venturers, currently held by Fremantle Venturer Sea Scouts.
 Mission Impossible
 Vencarna is a car event similar to the Rover Baja Car Rally.

Rovers
 Master Mariner Rover Oar, a premier boating competition in Western Australia for rovers, is currently held by Pelican Point Rover Sea Scouts.
 Mission Impossible.
 Rover Motor Sports, the Rover Baja Car Rally.

Water Activities/Sea Scouts (involving more than one section)
 Swan-A-Bout, the 30 hours sailing Marathon for the Scout section and above. The overall Trophy is currently held by Canning Sea Scouts. Waylen Bay Sea Scouts holds the dinghy, seaboat and keelboat classes while Canning Sea Scouts hold the catamaran and red-witch classes.
 Pelican Point Regatta is held bi-annually with other Sea Scout troops holding the regatta every second year. The last regatta was held as Waylen Bay Regatta in 2006. The shield is currently held by the Waylen Bay Sea Scouts.
 Como Regatta: The annual regatta is held at Scout Water Activity Centre at Como. The trophy is currently held by Waylen Bay Sea Scouts.
 Rowing Record: There is rowing challenge open to all Scouts and Venturers. It is between Nedlands and Applecross jetty. The current holders are the Waylen Bay Venturers, setting the record in 1984 in the sea boat Lyn Ward.

History 
In 2015, Western Australia's biggest scout group's meeting place and hall (1st Mandurah Scouts) was bulldozed, after the City of Mandurah sold the property to supermarket giant Aldi.

Girl Guiding Western Australia

Girl Guides Western Australia is one of the seven member organisations of Girl Guides Australia 
Girl Guides WA has around 2,600 members.

Girl Guide units operate throughout the state and are organised into regions:
 North Metro
 Joondalup
 Whitfords Coastal
 Seaward
 Darling Swan
 Peel
 River SeaWay
 Southern Foothills
 Capricorn
 Avon Hills
 Great Southern
 Three Rivers

Centenary

From 28 June 2014 to 28 June 2015, Girl Guides WA celebrated 100 years of Guiding in Western Australia.  A number of events and special projects were organised for the occasion, including a Centenary Dinner for adult members, past members and supporters,  "Jamboree with a Difference" and collection of information for the state archives.

Our Barn
Girl Guides WA operates "Our Barn" in York The original building on the property is from the Victorian Era and was originally the stables of Haversham House. It has a rich history, and was used by the Red Cross in World War II as a convalescent home for the armed services. Our Barn was converted into a dormitory by Girl Guides WA in the 1970s and officially opened as a Guide Property in 1977.

See also

 Scouting and Guiding in Australia

References

External links
Branch web pages

West Australia, Scouting in